Tavukgöğsü ("chicken breast") is a Turkish milk pudding made with shredded chicken breast. It was a delicacy served to Ottoman sultans in the Topkapı Palace, and is now a well-known dish in Turkey.

It has long been believed that this chicken pudding had originated in the Roman recipe collection Apicius, and it was later on passed to Eastern Roman Empire (Byzantium) and subsequently to the Ottoman Empire. However, no surviving copies of Apicius include such a recipe. Similar Arab dishes from the tenth century exist. Considering the lack of evidence for the Roman connection, the possible introduction of tavukgöğsü into Turkish cuisine is likely of Arab origin.

The traditional version uses white chicken breast meat. The meat is softened by boiling and separating the meat into very fine fibers or pounding until smooth. The meat is mixed with milk, sugar, cracked rice and other thickeners, and often some sort of flavoring such as cinnamon. The result is a thick pudding often shaped for presentation.

The dish is very similar to the medieval "white dish" (blancmange) that was common in the upper-class cuisine of Europe, and mentioned in The Canterbury Tales (though blancmange has since evolved into very different forms in modern Europe and Latin America).

See also
List of chicken dishes
Muhallebi
Blancmange
Turkish cuisine

References

Bibliography

https://web.archive.org/web/20100723190438/http://moreintelligentlife.com/content/lifestyle/jon-fasman/repasts-blanc-manger

Turkish puddings
Chicken dishes
Ottoman cuisine